Padel is a racket sport typically played in doubles on an enclosed court slightly smaller than a doubles tennis court. Scoring is the same as normal tennis, and the balls used are similar but with a little less pressure. The main differences are that the court has walls and the balls can be played off them in a similar way as in the game of squash and that solid, stringless bats are used. The height of the ball being served must be at or below the waist level.

Padel is different from the sport known in Canada and the United States as paddle tennis. It is also not to be confused with platform tennis, a winter and summer sport typically played at country clubs in Canada and the US, with courts heated from below to eliminate snow and water. The court, rules, and styles of play are very different.

Many well-known professional padel players have previously competed in tennis, including former WTA Tour players Roberta Vinci and Lara Arruabarrena.

History 
The sport was invented in Mexico by Enrique Corcuera in 1969. It is very popular in Spain and several countries in Latin America, especially Mexico, Argentina, Brazil, Ecuador, Panama and Chile. It is also relatively popular in UAE, Italy, Qatar, Kuwait, Bahrain, Egypt, Sweden, Portugal, Andorra and The Netherlands.

Spain
Padel Pro Tour (PPT) was the professional padel circuit which was created in 2005 as a result of the agreement between a group of organizers of matches of padel and Association of Professional Players of Padel (AJPP) and the Spanish Feminine Association of Pádel (AFEP). In 2014 WPT has travelled to Portugal, Argentina and Dubai.

The sport's popularity along the Costa del Sol in southern Spain and the Algarve in southern Portugal has exposed it to a large number of British visitors, leading to an increased popularity of the sport in the UK and a launch of the UK Padel Federation in 2011.

United States 
The US Padel Association was founded in Chattanooga, Tennessee in 1993, and opened two courts in the Chattanooga area. The American Padel Association was formed in 1995 and built its first courts at a private club in Houston, Texas for exhibition games. The first public courts opened in Miami, Florida in 2009, and several clubs have opened nearby, as well as in Torrance and San Diego in Southern California, since then.

Padel is played at the USTA National Tennis Campus in Orlando, Florida.

Austin, New York, Chicago and Philadelphia recently all have courts recently inaugurated.

Singapore 
In 2014, the Swiss Club in Singapore opened the first padel court in Singapore.

Egypt 
The sport was introduced in 2014 with the opening of some courts in suburbs near Cairo. The sport's popularity was growing slowly in its early years, until 2020, when the popularity of the sport exploded. As a result, more courts at several locations have been built, mostly around Cairo, but also in Alexandria and El Gouna. There are often tournaments being organised, where players can pay to participate, and winners earn prize money. The current format for tournaments currently comprises 4 levels: A, B, C and D.
Al-Ahly a major egyptian club have 4 padel courts. "PadelPod" is also considered one of the biggest Padel entities that owns over 12 Padel clubs with 30+ courts across Cairo, Alexandria, and North Coast.

Denmark 
The first Padel Court in Denmark was founded in Fredericia 2007. It has not been approved by the Danish Padel Association as the first, however generally to the public it is referred to as "The first".
Several clubs still use this old-school court for both leisure and Tournaments. The local club "Padøl-banden" are the proud owners of the court record of - longest match ever played. In 2012 they played 11 hours and 52 minutes over one match.

Finland 

Padel came to Finland in 2003. The official launch of the sport's official organisation was held on 26 November 2009.

Padel’s real popularity began after 2020, with an explosion in popularity during the COVID-19 pandemic.

In Finland, padel can now be played at 65–70 locations. According to statistics from the Finnish Padel Federation, there were 206 courts at the beginning of 2021, but in fact 250 already exist with around 150 new courts planned.

Sweden 
In 2021, there were approximately 700 Padel Courts in Sweden. The Swedish Padel Association (Svenska Padelförbundet) was included as a member of the Swedish Sports Confederation (Riksidrottsförbundet) in 2021.

The Caribbean 
The islands of Bahamas, Barbados, Dominican Republic, Guadeloupe, Martinique, Dutch St. Maarten, French St. Martin, Sint Eustatius (Statia), and Puerto Rico have Padel courts.

The two courts on the Dutch side of St. Maarten officially opened on 4 December 2021, the facilities are owned and managed by SXM Padel group from St. Maarten.  The group has expansion plans for more courts over the region.  The courts are open to the public and can be rented in intervals of 1 or 1.5 hours, rackets are also available for rent or sale.  They also have a fully stocked pro-shop on the premises.  On 1 October 2022 Belair Community Center added 2 new courts.  A regulation tournament court and the first singles Padel Tennis court in the Caribbean.  Both courts were manufactured by Padel10 in Spain and built by SXM Padel Group.  The island of St. Maarten has now a total of 5 Padel tennis courts.  At least 3 more courts will be built in St. Maarten during 2023.

From 1–4 December 2022 the International Senior Padel Tour will be hosting its first tournament at the SXM Padel club in Dutch St. Maarten.

China 
Tungwah Wenzel International School (Dongguan city, Guangdong) opened one of the first padel courts in South China. The city of Shanghai is leading the opening of new courts every year, with more than 25 courts planned to open in 2022.

Korea 
The Korea Padel Association(KPA) was officially certified by the International Padel Federration (FIP) in April 2021 to start a project to expand its base, and as of 2022, the front page of the unofficial court is in operation.

The court 

The superstructure is made from connecting 3m high x 2m wide panels, with an additional 1m mesh height over the glass back walls (10m walls). This additional 1m height is continued for 2m from each corner over the side walls also.  This means that the back walls and service corners are actually 4m in height, with the remaining side walls are 3m in height.

Glass panels make up the back walls and service side walls (closest 2 side panels to back walls), whilst metal mesh panels occupy the sides.

The service lines are placed  before the back wall and there will be also another line in middle that divides the central rectangle in half. All lines have a  width and should be clearly visible.

Facts 

 Serves: Both first and second serves must be underhand.
 Score: Scoring method is the same as in tennis.  Some circuits like the World Padel Tour and the International Senior Padel Tour use the "Golden Point" system.
 Ball: Padel balls are required for official matches and to set an optimum player experience. Shape and color are similar to tennis balls. Tennis balls can be used but not recommended.
 Padel Racquet: Solid with no strings. Has to be perforated by rule.
 Walls: Walls are used as part of the game.
 Levels: 1 beginner to 7 professional.

The basic rules 
Although Padel shares the same scoring system as tennis, the rules, strokes, and technique are different.

Format 
Most play in the sport of Padel is in doubles format.  Single courts are also available, the size of a singles court is 20 m x 6 m.

The first singles court in the Caribbean opened on 1 October 2022 at the Belair Community Center, manufactured by Padel10 from Barcelona, Spain and built by Sxm Padel Group.

Scoring 
Padel follows the same scoring as the tennis scoring system with the following exception:

 In the 2020 season, World Padel Tour introduced the "Gold Point" or "Golden Point", a new scoring method for main tournaments (Master Final, Master, Open and Challenger) organized by the World Padel Tour. This method of scoring has been widely adopted throughout non-professional tournaments as well.
 The golden point in Padel:
 The golden point occurs when the score reaches deuce during any game.
 The receiving team chooses whether the service will come from the right or left of the court.
 The team that wins that one single point will win the game.

See also 

 Padel World Championship
 Paddle tennis
 Real tennis, a precursor sport to modern tennis that also features an enclosed walled court.
 Femme Open, worlds largest female amateur tour, started in Sweden 2018.

Other forms 
 Modern Tennis
 Beach tennis
 Paddle Tennis
 Platform tennis
 Touchtennis

References

Sources

External links 
 International Padel Federation
 World Padel Tour
  International Senior Padel Tour

Games and sports introduced in 1969
Forms of tennis
Racket sports